This is a list of buildings that are examples of the Art Deco architectural style in North Carolina, United States.

Asheboro 
 Acme-McCrary Corporation, Asheboro, 1940s
 Asheboro Hosiery Mill No, 2, Asheboro, 1945
 Randolph Hospital, Asheboro, 1932

Asheville 
 Asheville City Hall, Asheville, 1928
 Asheville High School, Asheville, 1927
 Asheville Transfer and Storage Company Building, Asheville, 1929
 Bon Marche Department Store (now Earth Guild), Downtown Asheville Historic District, Asheville, 1937
 Clarence Barker Memorial Hospital, Asheville, 1929
 Coxe Building, Asheville, 1930
 F. W. Woolworth Building, Downtown Asheville Historic District, Asheville, 1939
 Fire Station No. 4, Asheville, 1927
 First Baptist Church, Asheville, 1927
 Flatiron Building, Downtown Asheville Historic District, Asheville, 1925
 Haverty Furniture Building, Asheville, 1928
 Isis Music Hall, West Asheville End of Car Line Historic District, Asheville, 1937
 Kress Emporium (former S. H. Kress and Co. Building), Asheville, 1927
 McGeahy Building, West Asheville–Aycock School Historic District, Asheville, 1934
 S&W Cafeteria, Asheville, 1929
 Shell Filling Station (now jewelers), Asheville, 1928
 The Strand (now Fine Arts Theater), Asheville, 1946
 United States District Court for the Western District of North Carolina, Asheville, 1929

Charlotte 
 American Legion Memorial Stadium, Charlotte, 1934
 Barringer Hotel, Charlotte, 1940 and 1950
 Century Building, Charlotte, 1926
 Charlotte Coca-Cola Bottling Company Plant, Charlotte, 1930
 Crane Company Building, Charlotte, 1928
 Mecklenburg Investment Company Building, Charlotte, 1922

Durham 
 333 West Main, Durham
 Clark and Sorrell Garage, Durham, 1932 and 1941
 Crowe Building, American Tobacco Historic District, Durham, 1953
 East Durham Junior High School (now Holton Career & Resource Center), Durham, 1939
 Fowler Building, Durham American Tobacco Historic District, Durham, 1939
 Herald-Sun Building, Durham, 1930
 Hill Building, Durham, 1937
 Liggett Office Building, Durham, 1920, 1946
 Royal Crown Cola – 7up Bottling Company Building, Durham, 1939
 S. H. Kress and Co. Building, Durham, 1933
 Scott and Roberts Dry Cleaning Plant, Office, and Store, Durham, 1947
 Snow Building, Durham, 1933
 Strickland Building, Durham American Tobacco Historic District, Durham, 1946
 Weeks Motor Company/Hutchin's Auto Supply, Durham, 1948

Elizabeth City 
 Selig Building, Elizabeth City Historic District, Elizabeth City, 1925
 Sheep–Harney Auditorium, Northside Historic District, Elizabeth City, 1950s
 S. L. Sheep School, Northside Historic District, Elizabeth City, 1940

Gastonia 
 S. H. Kress and Co. Building, Downtown Gastonia Historic District, Gastonia, 1930
 United States Post Office, Downtown Gastonia Historic District, Gastonia, 1935
 Webb Theatre, Gastonia, 1930

Greensboro 
 Ellis-Stone Building/Thalimer Department Store, Downtown Greensboro Historic District, Greensboro, 1906 and 1930s
 Guilford County Office and Court Building, Greensboro, 1937
 International Civil Rights Center and Museum (former F. W. Woolworth Building), Greensboro, 1939
 Isaacson Building, Downtown Greensboro Historic District, Greensboro, 1900 and 1930s
 L. Richardson Preyer Federal Building, Greensboro, 1933
 Mock, Judson, Voehringer Company Hosiery Mill, Greensboro, 1926
 S. H. Kress and Co. Building, Greensboro, 1929

Greenville 
 Bissette's Drug Store, Greenville Commercial Historic District, Greenville, 195
 Greenville Municipal Building, Greenville Commercial Historic District, Greenville, 1939
 L. M. Ernst Son & Company Building, Dickinson Avenue Historic District, Greenville, 1946
 Lautares Brothers Building, Greenville Commercial Historic District, Greenville, 1940
 Montgomery Ward Department Store, Greenville Commercial Historic District, Greenville, 1929
 Roxy Theatre, Greenville, 1948
 Smith Electric Building, Greenville Commercial Historic District, Greenville, 1920 and 1933
 Star Warehouse, Greenville Tobacco Warehouse Historic District, Greenville, 1930

Hamlet 
 Old Hamlet Opera House, Main Street Commercial Historic District, Hamlet, 1912 and 1927
 Subway Stations, Main Street Commercial Historic District, Hamlet, 1940
 Union Building, Main Street Commercial Historic District, Hamlet, 1920

Kinston 
 Carolina Theatre, Kinston Commercial Historic District, Kinston, 1935
 Community Council for the Arts (former Kinston Garage), Kinston Commercial Historic District, Kinston, 1936
 Hotel Kinston, Kinston, 1928
 Lenoir County Courthouse, Kinston, 1939
 Standard Drug No. 2, Kinston, 1924

Lenoir 
 Caldwell County Courthouse, Lenoir, 1929
 Center Theatre, Lenoir Downtown Historic District, Lenoir, 1941
 O. P. Lutz Furniture Company and Lutz Hosiery Mill, Lenoir Downtown Historic District, Lenoir, 1939

Mount Airy 
 Earle Theatre, Mount Airy Historic District, Mount Airy, 1938
 Masonic Temple, Mount Airy Historic District, Mount Airy, 1931
 United States Post Office, Mount Airy Historic District, Mount Airy, 1932
 Workman's Federal Savings and Loan, Mount Airy Historic District, Mount Airy, 1891 and 1930s

Raleigh 
 Capital Club Building, Raleigh, 1929
 Carolina Power and Light Company Car Barn and Automobile Garage, Raleigh, 1925
 CP & L Garage (now a tire shop), Raleigh, 1925
 Pine State Creamery, Raleigh, 1928
 Raleigh Water Works and E.B. Bain Water Treatment Plant, Raleigh, 1939
 Royal Baking Company, Raleigh, 1941

Rocky Mount 
 625 Sunset Apartments, Rocky Mount, 1945
 Baldwin Department Store, 100 NW Main, Rocky Mount
 CenturyLink Building (former Carolina Telephone & Telegraph Building), Rocky Mount Central City Historic District, Rocky Mount, 1948
 Firestone Stores Building, Rocky Mount Central City Historic District, Rocky Mount, 1930
 James Craig Braswell School, Rocky Mount, 1940
 Manhattan Theatre, Rocky Mount Central City Historic District, Rocky Mount, 1935
 Memorial Hospital, Rocky Mount, 1937
 Ritz Theatre, 150 E. Thomas, Rocky Mount, 1950

Winston-Salem 
 Pepper Building, Winston-Salem, 1928
 Reynolds Building, Winston-Salem, 1929
 Sosnik-Morris-Early Commercial Block, Winston-Salem, 1929

Other cities 
 Atlantic Bank and Trust Company Building, Burlington, 1928
 B&S Department Store, Downtown Wake Forest Historic District, Wake Forest, 1894 and 1949
 Belmont Junior High (former Belmont High School), Belmont Historic District, Belmont, 1939
 Ben's of Wake Forest Building, Downtown Wake Forest Historic District, Wake Forest, 1940
 Bladen County Recreation Center (former Gymnasium), Elizabethtown, 1940
 City Hall (former United States Post Office and Federal Building), Reidsville Historic District, Reidsville, 1926
 City Hall, Marion, 1937
 City Hall, Williamston Commercial Historic District, Williamston, 1960
 Co-Ed Cinema, Brevard, 1939
 County Armory, Eden, 1939
 Davis Sisters Building, Main Street Historic District, Forest City, 1932
 DeHart Building, Leaksville Commercial Historic District. Eden, 1930
 Don Gibson Theater, Shelby, 1939
 Enterprise Building, High Point, 1935
 Esso Gas Station, Four Oaks Commercial Historic District, Four Oaks, 1957
 Fire Department Headquarters, Goldsboro, 1939
 Garrou-Morganton Full-Fashioned Hosiery Mills, Morganton, 1927–1928
 Gem Theater, Kannapolis, 1936
 Gibson Theatre, Laurinburg Commercial Historic District, Laurinburg, 1940
 Graham Cinema, Graham, 1933
 Griffin Theatre, West Main Street Historic District, Forest City, 1948
 Hosiery Mill (former Dexdale Hosiery Company), Penderlea Homesteads Historic District, Willard, 1938
 Howell Theatre, Downtown Smithfield Historic District, Smithfield, 1935
 Joy Lee Apartment Building and Annex, Carolina Beach, 1945
 Kirby Cultural Arts Complex (former Kirby Theatre), Roxboro Commercial Historic District, Roxboro, 1949
 Lawsonville Avenue Elementary School, Reidsville, 1935
 Lexington Memorial Hospital, Lexington, 1946
 Liberty Theatre, Downtown Main Street Historic District, North Wilkesboro, 1946
 M & O Chevrolet Company, Fayetteville, 1937
 Masonic Temple Building, Shelby, 1924
 Mimosa Theatre, Morganton Downtown Historic District, Morganton, 1939
 Municipal Building (former Gabriel Johnston Hotel), Downtown Smithfield Historic District, Smithfield, 1937
 North Wilkesboro Police Department (former Town Hall), Downtown Main Street Historic District, North Wilkesboro, 1939
 Old Wilkesboro Municipal Building, Downtown Wilkesboro Historic District, Wilkesboro, 1930s
 O'Neil Building, Henderson Central Business Historic District, Henderson, 1885 and 1929
 Orpheum Theatre, Oxford, 1942
 Paramount Theatre, Farmville Historic District, Farmville, 1919 and 1933
 Parkway Theater, West Jefferson Historic District, West Jefferson, 1939
 Pepsi Bottling Company, West Selma Historic District, Selma, 1935
 Plymouth Theatre, Plymouth Historic District, Plymouth, 1937
 Police Department Building (former City Hall), Thomasville, 1938
 Rose's Dime Store Building, Canton Main Street Historic District, Canton, 1930
 Roxy Theatre (now a hardware store), Old Fort Commercial Historic District, Old Fort, 1946
 Salisbury Building, Salisbury, 1928
 Sampson Community Theatre (former Clinton Theatre), Clinton Commercial Historic District, Clinton, 1950
 Siler City High School, Siler City, 1922
 Smith Clinic, Thomasville, 1939
 Starnes Jewelers, Albemarle, 1920s
 Temple Theatre, Sanford, 1925
 Turnage Building, Ayden Historic District, Ayden, 1947
 United States Post Office, Burlington, 1936
 United States Post Office and Federal Building, Rockingham, 1936
 Watkins Building/Parker Drugstore, Henderson Central Business Historic District, Henderson, 1885 and 1930s
 Wilson Habitat Store (former Lovelace Motor Company), Wilson Central Business–Tobacco Warehouse Historic District, Wilson, 1937
 Wilson Municipal Building, Wilson, 1935
 WPTF Radio Transmitter, Cary, 1934
 Yancey Country Schools District Office (former Gymnasium), Burnsville, 1930s

See also 
 List of Art Deco architecture
 List of Art Deco architecture in the United States

References 

 "Art Deco & Streamline Moderne Buildings." Roadside Architecture.com. Retrieved 2019-01-03.
 Cinema Treasures. Retrieved 2022-09-06
 "Court House Lover". Flickr. Retrieved 2022-09-06
 "New Deal Map". The Living New Deal. Retrieved 2020-12-25.
 "North Carolina Architects & Builders : NCSU Libraries".  Retrieved 2019-01-03.
 "Home | Open Durham"Retrieved 2020-09-25.
 "SAH Archipedia". Society of Architectural Historians. Retrieved 2021-11-21.

External links
 

 
Art Deco
Art Deco architecture in North Carolina
North Carolina-related lists